The men's 30 kilometre cross-country skiing competition at the 1968 Winter Olympics in Grenoble, France, was held on Wednesday 7 February at Autrans.

Each skier started at half a minute intervals, skiing the entire 30 kilometre course. Eero Mäntyranta of Finland was the 1966 World champion and also the defending Olympic champion from the 1964 Olympics in Innsbruck, Austria.

Results
Sources:

References

External links
 Final results (International Ski Federation)

Men's cross-country skiing at the 1968 Winter Olympics
Men's 30 kilometre cross-country skiing at the Winter Olympics